Tarik Glenn (born May 25, 1976) is a former American football offensive tackle who played 10 seasons for the Indianapolis Colts of the National Football League (NFL).. He played college football for California and was drafted by the Colts in the first round of the 1997 NFL draft. Glenn made three Pro Bowls and was a part of the Colts team that beat the Chicago Bears in Super Bowl XLI.

High school and college career
Glenn performed as two-way lineman at Bishop O'Dowd High School in Oakland, California, and later attended the University of California, Berkeley, where he was a four-year letterman and two-year starter. He started his career at defensive tackle before moving to offensive tackle in his junior year.

Professional career

Glenn was selected by the Indianapolis Colts in the first round (19th overall) of the 1997 NFL Draft. He started all 16 games in seven of his 10 pro seasons, missing six games in 2003 with a knee injury. He made his first Pro Bowl appearance in the 2004 season, which wound up being the first of 3 consecutive Pro Bowls that he participated in. However, when the NFL told Glenn that he would also appear in the 2006 Pro Bowl, they later informed him that he did not receive enough votes, and that he would be an alternate. Glenn did end up participating in the 2006 Pro Bowl replacing the injured Willie Roaf. Tony Dungy, who generally backed the NFL, stated that he was disappointed with the way in which the NFL handled this particular situation.

On July 24, 2007, following winning Super Bowl XLI the season before, Glenn announced his retirement, saying he had lost his passion for football. Glenn was inducted into the Indianapolis Colts Ring of Honor at halftime of a Colts 2022 regular season game against the Washington Commanders.

Personal life
In August 2011, Glenn became President of D.R.E.A.M. Alive, Inc., an Indianapolis-based non-profit organization founded by Glenn and his wife, Maya.

Glenn completed his BA degree in Social Welfare from UC Berkeley in 1999. He pursued a Master of Business Administration in the Executive Education program at the Purdue University Krannert School of Management, and graduated in December 2012.

References

1976 births
Living people
Players of American football from Oakland, California
African-American players of American football
American football offensive tackles
American football offensive guards
California Golden Bears football players
Indianapolis Colts players
American Conference Pro Bowl players
21st-century African-American sportspeople
20th-century African-American sportspeople